Aclytia punctata is a moth of the family Erebidae. It was described by Arthur Gardiner Butler in 1876. It is found in Honduras, Guatemala, Costa Rica and Brazil (Pará).

References

Moths described in 1876
Aclytia
Moths of Central America
Moths of South America